Jeníkov is a municipality and village in Teplice District in the Ústí nad Labem Region of the Czech Republic. It has about 900 inhabitants.

Administrative parts
The village of Oldřichov is an administrative part of Jeníkov.

References

Villages in Teplice District